The Crowning Touch is a 1959 British comedy film directed by David Eady and starring Ted Ray, Irene Handl and Greta Gynt.

Plot
The "Crowning Touch" of the title is a fancy ladies hat. It has been ordered and specially set aside at a posh British hat shop, but no one has come to collect it. Three of the shop's staff offer different reasons as to why the pretty young girl who'd ordered the hat never showed up.

Cast
 Ted Ray as Bert
 Greta Gynt as Rosie
 Griffith Jones as Mark
 Sydney Tafler as Joe
 Dermot Walsh as Aubrey Drake
 Maureen Connell as Julia
 Colin Gordon as Stacey
 Irene Handl as Bebe
 Allan Cuthbertson as Philip
 Diane Hart as Tess
 Joan Benham as Daphne
 Maurice Kaufmann as David

Critical reception
Allmovie called the film "a serviceable British shaggy-dog story, graced by the presence of such top talents as Greta Gynt, Griffith Jones, Sydney Tafler, Dermot Walsh and Irene Handl."
TV Guide called it an "okay English comedy...A number of distinguished performers lift this one above the average."

References

External links
 

1959 films
1959 comedy films
1950s English-language films
Films directed by David Eady
British comedy films
1950s British films